The 2003 Villanova Wildcats football team was an American football team that represented the Villanova University in the Atlantic 10 Conference during the 2003 NCAA Division I-AA football season. In their 19th season under head coach Andy Talley, the Wildcats compiled an 7–4 overall record with a 5–4 mark in conference play. They were ranked number 25 in the polls.

Schedule

References

Villanova
Villanova Wildcats football seasons
Villanova Wildcats football